The men's light middleweight (71 kg/156.2 lbs) Low-Kick division at the W.A.K.O. European Championships 2006 in Skopje was the sixth heaviest of the male Low-Kick tournaments and involved fifteen fighters.  Each of the matches was three rounds of two minutes each and were fought under Low-Kick kickboxing rules.

As there were too few fighters for a tournament designed for sixteen, one of the men received a bye into the quarter finals.  The tournament gold medal was won by Konstantin Sbytov from Russia who defeated Serbian Milan Dragojlovic in the final via a unanimous decision victory.  It was Konstantin's second gold medal in a row and his third overall (he had also won at Budva '04 and Agadir '05).  Defeated semi finalists Michał Głogowski from Poland and Ludovic Millet from France, who would both go on to have successful pro careers, won bronze medals for their efforts.

Results

Key

See also
List of WAKO Amateur European Championships
List of WAKO Amateur World Championships
List of male kickboxers

References

External links
 WAKO World Association of Kickboxing Organizations Official Site

W.A.K.O. European Championships 2006 (Skopje)